Mehringer is a surname. Notable people with this surname include:

 Drew Mehringer, American football coach and former player
 Heinrich Mehringer, German biathlete
 Karen Mehringer, American public speaker, psychotherapist, and the founder of Creative Transformations
 Karl Mehringer, German mountaineer and climber
 Peter Mehringer, American Olympic wrestler